HD 66428 b is a long-period jovian exoplanet located approximately 174 light-years away in the constellation of Monoceros. The average distance is 3.18 AU, about half the distance between Mars and Jupiter. This planet is a so-called eccentric Jupiter with an orbital eccentricity of 0.465. At periastron, the distance is 1.70 AU and at apastron, the distance is 4.66 AU. In 2022, the inclination and true mass of HD 66428 b were measured via astrometry.

See also
 HD 70642 b

References

External links
 
 

Monoceros (constellation)
Giant planets
Exoplanets discovered in 2006
Exoplanets detected by radial velocity
Exoplanets detected by astrometry